Marta Madrenas i Mir (born 1 November 1967) is a Spanish politician and lawyer from Catalonia. Since 2016, she has served as mayor of Girona.

Since 17 January 2018 she has been a member of the Parliament of Catalonia in the 12th term of office for the electoral coalition Together for Catalonia.

Career 
Madrenas has a degree in law from the Autonomous University of Barcelona (UAB) and, after completing her higher education, from 2003 to 2010 she was president of the Girona Property Agents' Association and vice-president of the Catalan Council of COAPI.

She is a member of the Democratic Convergence of Catalonia party (CDC). During Carles Puigdemont's term as mayor, she became his trusted auxiliary, appearing as his representative during neighbourhood disputes. After winning the elections, she became the second deputy mayor of Economic Promotion and Employment.

In January 2016, after the sudden investiture of Carles Puigdemont as the new president of the Generalitat of Catalonia,  became the new mayor of the city and Madrenas continued to head his posts in the city council but adding to them the competence of town planning. Less than three months later, Albert Ballesta resigned due to the problems he had in reaching agreements with the other parties to approve him as mayor. Madrenas became the new mayor of Girona on March 18. In May 2019, Madrenas was elected mayor of Girona for a second term.

References

1967 births
People from Girona
Politicians from Catalonia
Women lawyers from Catalonia
Women mayors of places in Spain
Living people
Catalan nationalists
Women politicians from Catalonia
20th-century Spanish lawyers